Glendora is an unincorporated community and census-designated place (CDP) located within Gloucester Township, in Camden County, New Jersey, United States. As of the 2010 United States Census, the CDP's population was 4,750.

Geography
According to the United States Census Bureau, the CDP had a total area of 1.062 square miles (2.751 km2), including 1.040 square miles (2.695 km2) of land and 0.022 square miles (0.056 km2) of water (2.04%).

It is home to the unusual Cookie Jar House, constructed in the 1940s and described as "One of N.J.'s oddest homes".

Demographics

Census 2010

Census 2000
As of the 2000 United States Census there were 4,907 people, 1,944 households, and 1,294 families living in the CDP. The population density was 1,770.7/km2 (4,596.2/mi2). There were 1,997 housing units at an average density of 720.6/km2 (1,870.5/mi2). The racial makeup of the CDP was 97.55% White, 0.51% African American, 0.16% Native American, 0.33% Asian, 0.02% Pacific Islander, 0.43% from other races, and 1.00% from two or more races. Hispanic or Latino of any race were 1.57% of the population.

There were 1,944 households, out of which 26.5% had children under the age of 18 living with them, 52.9% were married couples living together, 10.0% had a female householder with no husband present, and 33.4% were non-families. 29.8% of all households were made up of individuals, and 19.1% had someone living alone who was 65 years of age or older. The average household size was 2.52 and the average family size was 3.17.

In the CDP the population was spread out, with 21.5% under the age of 18, 7.3% from 18 to 24, 28.5% from 25 to 44, 22.4% from 45 to 64, and 20.3% who were 65 years of age or older. The median age was 40 years. For every 100 females, there were 88.7 males. For every 100 females age 18 and over, there were 82.6 males.

The median income for a household in the CDP was $42,801, and the median income for a family was $51,989. Males had a median income of $39,389 versus $29,334 for females. The per capita income for the CDP was $21,089. About 3.4% of families and 6.4% of the population were below the poverty line, including 6.0% of those under age 18 and 11.5% of those age 65 or over.

Notable people

People who were born in, residents of, or otherwise closely associated with Glendora include:
 A. Raymond Randolph (born 1943), federal judge on the United States Court of Appeals for the District of Columbia Circuit who was appointed to the court in 1990.

References

Census-designated places in Camden County, New Jersey
Gloucester Township, New Jersey